Sympistis meadiana is a species of moth in the family Noctuidae (the owlet moths).

The MONA or Hodges number for Sympistis meadiana is 10098.

References

Further reading

 
 
 

meadiana
Articles created by Qbugbot
Moths described in 1875